Oakwood, Wisconsin  may refer to:
Oakwood, Milwaukee County, Wisconsin
Oakwood, Winnebago County, Wisconsin